Cogie Hill railway station, also known as Cogie Hill Halt railway station and Cogie Hill Crossing railway station served the village of Winmarleigh, Lancashire, England, from 1870 to 1930 on the Garstang and Knot-End Railway.

History 
The station opened on 5 December 1870 by the Garstang and Knot-End Railway. It was situated on the west side of Island Lane. Services resumed on 17 May 1875 when a new engine was purchased. Moss Litter works opened to the north in 1889 and it was given its own private siding. In the late 1920s, the bus service was introduced and it deemed the passenger services uneconomic so it closed on 31 March 1930.

References

External links 

Disused railway stations in the Borough of Wyre
Railway stations in Great Britain opened in 1870
Railway stations in Great Britain closed in 1872
Railway stations in Great Britain opened in 1875
Railway stations in Great Britain closed in 1930
1870 establishments in England
1930 disestablishments in England